4-Phenyl-1,2,4-triazoline-3,5-dione (PTAD) is an azodicarbonyl compound. PTAD is one of the strongest dienophiles and reacts rapidly with dienes in Diels-Alder reactions. The most prominent use of PTAD was the first synthesis of prismane in 1973.

Synthesis
The compound was first synthesized in 1894 by  Johannes Thiele and O. Stange. The oxidation of  4-Phenylurazol with lead tetroxide in sulfuric acid yielded small quantities  of the substance. It took until 1971 when  a practical synthesis was published. The synthesis starts from hydrazine and diethyl carbonate. The product of this step is reacted with  phenyl isocyanate and subsequently transformed to the  4-Phenylurazol. Cyclization and subsequent oxidation yields PTAD (6).

References

Triazoles
Phenyl compounds